Ko Yao is a district (amphoe) in Phang Nga province in Thailand's south.

History

Early history
Numerous cave paintings hidden around Ko Yao Island date back more than 2,000 years and attest distinct influence to its communities living today in the southern mainland provinces of Thailand.

The early inhabitants of Ko Yao were the Moken peoples (Sea Gypsies). Other nomadic peoples of the region are believed to be more recent migrants from the Malay peninsula, who settled on the islands in the 17th-18th centuries. These later arrivals include the Maniq people, the Semang and other Negrito peoples, all often interchangeably known, especially prior to the mid-20th century, as Sakai, a name now considered derogatory by the groups themselves and many Thais.

The Mon people, belonging to the Khmer ethnolinguistic group, settled in peninsular Thailand ruling over maritime states like Ligor (Nakhon Si Thammarat). They melded with northern and southern migrants from Malaysia and Thailand, over centuries of commercial exchange and political conflict. The Mon stock remains prevalent for most of the people living in southern Thailand today, including the people of Ko Yao.

20th century
The minor district (king amphoe) Ko Yao was established in 1903 as a subordinate of Mueang Phang Nga district. On 1 January 1988 it was upgraded to a full district.

Geography
The district covers several islands of the Ko Yao archipelago in Phang Nga Bay, near the island of Phuket. The two main islands are named Ko Yao Yai and Ko Yao Noi ('big long island' and 'small long island'). The northern tips of the islands are part of Ao Phang Nga National Park.

Religion
Ninety percent of the district's population (2018) of 18,000 are Muslims. The Muslim religion was introduced in the 13th century by Arab traders.

Administration 
The district is divided into three sub-districts (tambons), which are further subdivided into 18 villages (mubans). Ko Yao itself has sub-district municipality (thesaban tambon) status, which covers parts of tambon Ko Yao Noi. There are a further three tambon administrative organizations (TAO).

References

External links

amphoe.com (Thai)

Ko Yao
Islands of Thailand